Refugees of the Syrian Civil War in Turkey are the Syrian refugees fleeing the Syrian Civil War. The Republic of Turkey hosts over 3.7 million registered refugees.

As part of Turkey's migrant crisis, according to the United Nations High Commissioner for Refugees (UNHCR), in 2018 Turkey was hosting 63% of all of the Syrian refugees in the world. More than a third of the refugees are hosted in Southeastern Turkey, near the Syria-Turkey border.

Statistics 
 there are 3,763,565 registered Syrian refugees in Turkey.

Milestones 
 June, 2011: Refugee flow into Turkey with the military siege of Jisr al-Shughour in the northwestern part of Syria.
 November, 2011: Turkey had spent up to $15 million to set up six camps for thousands of refugees and military defectors, however Turkish officials declare that Syrians are "guests" and not "refugees."
 April, 2012: Refugee flow ahead of UN ceasefire. Over 2,500 swell across Turkish-Syrian border in one day, the highest ever recorded.
 July, 2012: Refugee flow ahead of fighting in Aleppo.
 September, 2012: UNHCR reports that more than 11,000 Syrians flee into Turkey in a day's time.

Settlement (repatriation, transit) 

In 2014, the capacity of the camps established in 2012 and 2013 became insufficient.  In 2014, refugees according to their own preferences begin to migrate across provinces.

About 30% live in 22 government-run camps near the Syrian border.

The number of refugees in transit to Europe dramatically increased in 2015.

Citizenship 
Up to 300,000 Syrian refugees living in Turkey could be given citizenship, allegedly, under a plan to keep wealthy and educated Syrians in the country. The current policy towards the Syrian refugees provides temporary protection and homage non-European refugees. According to the policy, Turkey has a legal responsibility towards European refugees only, but for the rest it is only through voluntary action. The temporary protection offered by Turkey to Syrians seeking refuge in the country means that they are limited in some ways. Under temporary protection, Syrians in Turkey are limited from working, especially in formal employment. The temporary protection policy does not guarantee the Syrian refugees permanent protection that would allow them to compete for jobs equally with the Turkish citizens. In some cases the large number of refugees in the country has contributed to the nation changing its citizenship laws to integrate some of the refugees from Syria. Skilled Syrians are provided with citizenship because they contribute positively to the growth of the economy.

Conditions 

As of April 2014 (2011–2014):
 595,280 individuals reached through information campaigns, participatory assessments, activities to raise public awareness on rights, entitlements, services and assistance;
 205,899 children with protection needs were identified and referred to services;
 115,225 children participated in structured, sustained child protection or psycho-social support programme;
 145,433 youth and adolescents have attended empowerment programme enhancing their participation, communication, peer-to-peer interaction and self-confidence;
 18,793 Individuals, including children, have been reached through community-based initiatives for prevention and mitigation of gender-based violence;

As of April 2018 (2011–2018):
 593,616 individuals have received hygiene kits, dignity kits or sanitary items;
 87,198 individuals have benefited from assistance in accessing adequate shelter;
 470,000 Syrians and host community members have benefited from improved municipal services, focusing among others on waste and waste water management.

Financial aid 

Turkey allocated US$30 billion between 2011 and 2018 on refugee assistance.

Over 13 million Syrians received aid from the Turkish Aid Agency (AFAD). Turkey has spent more than any other country on Syrian refugee aid, and has also been subject to criticism for opening refugee camps on the Syrian side of the border.

Financial aid from other countries to Syrian Refugees has been limited, though €3,200,000,000 was promised by the EU in November 2015. In March 2016, the EU and Turkey agreed on the EU-Turkey Statement, which involved a number of political concessions as well as 'another €3 billion in aid, if Turkey agreed to a readmission of Syrians arriving in Greece and tighter border controls.'

In 2018, the Directorate General of Migration Management built a fingerprint identification system for a more efficient distribution of financial aid to Syrian Refugees.

On 2 December 2021, the EU announced it would be providing assistance of €325 million (around $368 million) for refugees in Turkey. The aid would be loaded on to the debit cards of refugees, helping more than 1.5 million to cover their most essential needs, such as food, rent, transport and medicine.

Employment 
Under Turkish law, Syrian refugees cannot apply for resettlement but only temporary protection status. Registering for temporary protection status gives access to state services such as health and education, as well as the right to apply for a work permit in certain geographic areas and professions. Over a third of urban refugees are not registered.

A study which was supported by the Istanbul University Scientific Research Projects unit and conducted by academics from a number of universities, revealed that the vast majority of Syrians in Turkey are employed in unregistered work for significantly lower wages compared to their Turkish counterparts.

However, compared to the increase in refugees, benefits for the increased number of people did not increase accordingly. In fact, only 712,218 were given residency permits only 56,024 work permits were given to the Syrians by 2017.

Housing 
Turkey's response to the refugee crisis is different from most other countries. As a World Bank report noted: It is a non-camp and government financed approach, as opposed to directing refugees into camps that rely on humanitarian aid agencies for support.

Nativism and Welfare Chauvinism 
Nativism has emerged as a significant issue in Turkish politics concerning Syrian immigration and refugees. In recent years, the Turkish public discussions have witnessed an increase in patriotism during the cross-border military offensive against the Syrian regime, with nationalist keywords being used to target Syrian immigrants and refugees. The COVID-19 pandemic has further exacerbated the situation, with welfare chauvinism dominating the social media discourse. Turkish citizens are increasingly viewed as deserving of priority in social benefits offered by the government, leading to negative attitudes towards immigrants. However, despite the anti-immigrant sentiments, symbolic nativism is barely present in discussions, and cultural markers are not strongly emphasized. Immigrants are seldom framed as a threat to the "Turkish way of life," and instead, the cowardice of immigrants is a frequently recurring concept in social media posts with patriotic content. This complex interplay between patriotism, welfare chauvinism, and anti-immigrant attitudes in Turkish politics is an area of ongoing research and analysis.

Racism 

Anti-Arab sentiments in the country have significantly increased since the influx of Syrian refugees into Turkey.

Education 
Turkey is trying to ensure that all refugee children can access a form of learning and be fully integrated into the formal education system.

Currently, 30% of Syrian refugee children have access to education, 4,000 businesses have been opened, and several Syrian refugee camps have grown into small towns with amenities from healthcare to barber shops.

As of March 2018, about 60% (600,000 primary and secondary education) of Syrian school-aged children under temporary protection remain in school. The EU has supported education, through a €300 million direct grant to the Ministry of National Education. Turkey's educational support:
 National Conditional Cash Transfers for Education of 2017 (CCTE): 300,000 Syrian children's family received. Cash Transfers to families encourages (1) enrolment, (2) improves school attendance (3) referral of children at risk to Child Protective Services
 Early childhood and pre-primary education: 45,580 enrolment.
 Formal education (Grades 1–12): 612,603 enrolment.
 Informal non-accredited education (Sunday school): 20,806 enrolment.
 State universities: 19,332 enrolment (Turkey waived tuition fees)
 Accelerated Learning Programme (ALP): targeting 10 to 18-year-old out-of-school adolescents.
 Teachers and education personnel: 128,843 education personnel acquired special training. 12,965 Syrian volunteer trainers and education personnel were provided with financial compensation.

Healthcare 

As of October 2014 (2011–2014), Turkey provided with its own resources:
250,000 inpatient care; 
200,000 operated on; 
150,000 births; 
6 million consultations

See also 

Syrian Civil War
 Refugees of the Syrian Civil War
 Syrians in Turkey

References 

Refugees of the Syrian civil war
Syrian civil war
Syrian emigrants to Turkey